Neguinho do Samba ( – October 31, 2009), born Antonio Luis Alves de Souza, was a Brazilian percussionist and musician. Samba was the founder of Olodum, an internationally known cultural group based in Salvador, Brazil. Samba, a resident of Pelourinho, was considered to be the "father" of samba reggae in Bahia.

In 1990, Samba appeared as a musician on Paul Simon's album, The Rhythm of the Saints.
In 1996, Olodum appeared in the music video for Michael Jackson's single "They Don't Care About Us". 

Neguinho do Samba died of heart failure on October 31, 2009, at the age of 54. Samba was buried in the Jardim da Saudade cemetery in Salvador.

References

1950s births
Year of birth missing
2009 deaths
People from Salvador, Bahia
Samba musicians
Brazilian percussionists